"Te Voy A Perder" (English: I Am Going To Lose You) is a song written by Áureo Baqueiro and Leonel García, recorded by Mexican performer Alejandro Fernández, and released as second single from Viento a Favor (2007), It was released on April 16, 2007 (see 2007 in music). A version Mexican singer Leonel García featuring American duo Ha*Ash was released on August 20, 2013.

Song information
According to the singer's official website , the song is "a love declaration about the imminent break-up from the person you love"
. The track was nominated for "Song of the Year" at the "Oye Awards" in Mexico, which was awarded to "Te Lo Agradezco, Pero No" by Alejandro Sanz and Shakira.

Music video
The music video for this single was directed by Simon Brand, who directed another two videos for the artist ("Me Dediqué a Perderte" and "Que Lástima"). The shooting took place in Mexico City and Tampico, Tamaulipas, on May 12 to 14, 2007. The plot is about a love story (starred by Jaidy Michel) and also includes Fernández making a performance on a crane ship.

The main performance of the song (with Alejandro and his band) is on the ship's helipad. This ship was built in Russia in 1994 and originally was the drillship Arktikshelf and starting in 2005 was reconstructed to the crane vessel Garzprom 2. The aerial shot captures the size of the ship. For this video a crew of 200 people was needed.

Along with the performance, a couple is shown with romantic attitudes, but as the history develops it is also shown that he does not trust her and tries to find evidence of infidelity, only to find out that she was not cheating on him and loses her.

The video received a nomination for the "Oye Award" for Video of the Year, losing to "Me Muero" by Spanish band La Quinta Estación.

Chart performance
In the United States, on the Billboard Hot Latin Tracks the single entered at number 49 in the week of June 9, 2007, climbing to number 24 the following week and eight weeks later (August 11) peaking at number 9. The track spent 20 weeks on this chart, and ranked at number 38 in the year-end chart of 2007.

Leonel García and Ha*Ash version 

"Te Voy A Perder" is a song by Mexican singer Leonel García featuring American duo Ha*Ash. It was released on August 20, 2013 as the third single from his studio album Todas Mías (2013).

A music video for "Te Voy A Perder" was released on August 20, 2013. It currently has over 24 million views. The track peaked at number 9 in the Mexico Airplay and at number 22 in the Mexico Espanol Airplay charts in the México.

Chart performance

See also 

 List of number-one songs of 2007 (Mexico)

References

2007 singles
2007 songs
2013 singles
Songs written by Leonel García
Songs written by Áureo Baqueiro
Song recordings produced by Áureo Baqueiro
Alejandro Fernández songs
Ha*Ash songs
Monitor Latino Top General number-one singles
Music videos directed by Simon Brand
Sony BMG Norte singles
2000s ballads
Pop ballads